The National Bureau of Investigation (Ukrainian: НБР, Національної Бюро Розслідувань України) was an organization in Ukraine dedicated to prejudicial investigation on especially dangerous crimes. Its most recent inception was formed in 2005 by President Viktor Yushchenko. Subordinated to the General Prosecutor of Ukraine.

References 

Ukrainian intelligence agencies
Law enforcement agencies of Ukraine
Institutions with the title of National in Ukraine